Touch Me Not is a 2018 internationally co-produced drama film directed by Adina Pintilie and starring Laura Benson, Tómas Lemarquis, and Dirk Lange. The film was screened in the main competition section at the 68th Berlin International Film Festival where it won the Golden Bear. Touch Me Not is an experiment between fiction and documentary, and addresses the prejudices of people related to intimacy.

Cast
 Laura Benson as herself
 Tómas Lemarquis as himself
 Dirk Lange as Radu
 Hanna Hofmann as herself
 Christian Bayerlein as himself
 Grit Uhlemann as herself
 Irmena Chichikova as Mona
 Adina Pintilie as herself
 Seani Love as himself

Reception
According to a list by Screen International, the film received an average rating of 1,5 of four possible stars by film critics at the Berlinale and was thereby in the third-last place of all films in the Berlinale main competition. It was seen as a controversial film, viewers left the cinema in rows. The Golden Bear awarded by the Berlinale jury thus came as a surprise.

The site's critical consensus reads, "Touch Me Not deserves admiration for its efforts to debunk stereotypes and further a necessary dialogue, even if the execution never lives up to those lofty ambitions." On Metacritic, the film has a weighted average score of 68 out of 100, based on 5 critics, indicating "generally favorable reviews".

Deborah Young of The Hollywood Reporter praised the film, describing it as "an eye-opening look at human sexuality". She stated, "Though not every moment is fascinating to watch, most moments are, and adult audiences should find its frank presentation of the diversity of intimacy thought-provoking and possibly therapeutic."

In a negative review, Peter Bradshaw of The Guardian called the film "embarrassingly awful", criticising "its mediocrity, its humourless self-regard, its fatuous and shallow approach to its ostensible theme of intimacy, and the clumsy way all this was sneakily elided with Euro-hardcore cliches about BDSM, alternative sexualities, fetishism and exhibitionism." He described the film's recognition at the Berlinale as a "calamity" for the festival.

References

External links
 
 

2018 films
2018 drama films
Bulgarian drama films
Czech drama films
2010s English-language films
English-language Bulgarian films
English-language Czech films
English-language French films
English-language German films
English-language Romanian films
2010s German-language films
French drama films
German drama films
Golden Bear winners
Romanian drama films
2010s French films
2010s German films